Isi ewu  is a traditional Igbo dish that is made with a goat's head.

It is an Igbo soup similar to spicy cow feet (nkwobi) except that isi ewu is made up of goat head while the latter is made up of cow foot. Some restaurants choose to cook the whole head at once but to reduce the amount of water required to cook the soup, the goat head is cut into reasonable pieces .

Ingredients 
A Goat head, Calabash nutmeg also known as Ehu seed, Onion, Potash, Palm oil, Utazi leaves, and Ugba are required to cook Isi Ewu soup

Preparation 
The meat is boiled until tender inside a pot; a pressure cooker is mostly used due to the toughness of goat meat.

Grated onion, seasoning, pepper and salt are added to thickened palm oil made from Potash mixture another pot entirely by adding potash mixture by adding water to it.

The goat head, brain separate (mashed with mortar), Calabash nutmeg,ugba are also added to the thickened palm oil after some minutes.

Isi Ewu is served with sliced onions and Utazi leaves when done.

See also
 Nigerian cuisine
 Igbo cuisine
 List of African dishes
 List of goat dishes

References

External links
Isi-Ewu: The Anatomy Of A National Delicacy,  an article by Uche Nworah

Igbo cuisine
Nigerian soups
Goat dishes